is a Japanese politician who served as the Minister of Justice of Japan from August 2022 to November 2022. A member of the Liberal Democratic Party (LDP), he also serves in the House of Representatives since 2003. A native of Ibaraki Prefecture and graduate of the University of Tokyo he joined the National Police Agency in 1982. Leaving the agency in 1999, he was elected to public office for the first time in 2003, representing the 3rd District of Ibaraki prefecture, which includes the cities of Ryugasaki and Ushiku, among others.

Hanashi resigned as Justice Minister on 11 November 2022 following comments he made to a political gathering earlier in the week suggesting that his position became "a top story in daytime news programs only when stamping a seal on documents of execution."

References

External links 
  in Japanese.

1959 births
Living people
Japanese police officers
Liberal Democratic Party (Japan) politicians
Members of the House of Representatives (Japan)
Politicians from Ibaraki Prefecture
University of Tokyo alumni
21st-century Japanese politicians
Ministers of Justice of Japan